The 41st World Cup season was scheduled to begin on 28 October 2006, but cancellation of the opening races in Sölden delayed the season's start by two weeks.  A very poor snowpack in the Alps, along with stormy weather in January, caused numerous races to be moved and rescheduled throughout the winter. The schedule included a mid-season break during the first 3 weeks of February for the World Championships in Åre, Sweden. The season concluded on 18 March 2007, at the World Cup Finals in Lenzerheide, Switzerland.

Summary
The top two finishers from last season, Benjamin Raich of Austria and Aksel Lund Svindal of Norway, at the top of the standings for most of the season. With consistent podium performances in the speed races, which won him the Cup title in downhill, Didier Cuche of Switzerland finished a solid third overall. The 2005 overall champion and last year's third-place finisher, American Bode Miller, won four speed events but struggled in the technical events, keeping him from the top spots in the overall standings throughout the season. Before the final four individual races of the season, these four athletes still had a mathematical chance to win the overall World Cup title. The strongest newcomer was Jens Byggmark of Sweden, who won the first two races of his career on consecutive days in late January to vault temporarily into the top ranks in the slalom standings. Also in slalom, Mario Matt of Austria came back to win three races in 2007, regaining his top form from the 2000 and 2001 seasons.  Matt ultimately lost the slalom title to Raich by just 5 points.

The early season on the women's side was led by Marlies Schild of Austria, who won six slaloms and a super combined, clinching both of these Cups early.  But the biggest story of the season's first half was the resurgence of Austria's Renate Götschl, who was coming off a difficult 2006 season which saw her drop to 19th in the overall standings, her worst finish since 1994. She rebounded to dominate the speed events, winning four races in Super G and three in downhill, securing the trophies in both of these events. American Julia Mancuso, 2006 Olympic gold medalist, had a very strong season, scoring the first four World Cup wins of her career. Nicole Hosp of Austria had a solid season with several podium positions, but few victories. Lindsey Kildow of the US celebrated three victories before she had to drop out after the World Championships due to a knee injury. Entering the World Cup Finals, four women – Hosp, Götschl, Mancuso, and Schild – were within a 102-point range, and each of them had a realistic chance of winning the overall World Cup title.

At the World Cup Finals in Lenzerheide, Switzerland, both the men's and women's overall titles came down to the technical events.

On the men's side, the race came down to Raich and Svindal.  Going into the technical events, Raich looked unbeatable but a DNF for him in GS meant that Svindal would have an opportunity to clinch the title on the final day in slalom, his weakest event.  Svindal needed only to finish in the top fifteen and score points in order to win the title, and he achieved it in hair-raising fashion – by finishing 15th.

Marlies Schild seemed a sure bet for the women's overall title after uncharacteristically strong performances in the speed events. But she skied disastrously in the slalom, the event that she had dominated all season long, and failed to score any points.  That meant she needed both a strong performance in the GS and a weak one from her lone remaining rival, Nicole Hosp.  But Hosp won the race while Schild managed just sixth place, ensuring the Cup title (and the GS globe) for Hosp.

Calendar

Men

Ladies

Nations team event

Men's standings

Overall 
see complete table

Downhill 
see complete table

Slalom 
see complete table

Giant slalom 
see complete table

Super G 
see complete table

Super combined 
see complete table

Ladies' standings

Overall

Downhill

Slalom

Giant slalom

Super G

Super combined

Nations Cup

Overall

Ladies

Men

See also 
FIS Alpine World Ski Championships 2007

Footnotes

References

External links
FIS-ski.com – World Cup standings – 2007

2006-07
World Cup
World Cup